Zuenir Carlos Ventura (born June 1, 1931, in Além Paraíba, Minas Gerais) is a Brazilian journalist and writer. He is a columnist for the newspaper O Globo, and for Época magazine. He won the Jabuti Prize in 1995 in the "reportage" category for the book Cidade Partida. In 2009, his book 1968 - O que Fizemos de Nós won the third place at the same category of the prize. In 1989, he and his team of journalists from Jornal do Brasil won the Esso Journalism Award for their reportage on Chico Mendes' murder investigation.

Zuenir was born in Minas Gerais and moved to Rio de Janeiro during his youth. He had to work in order to pay his superior studies. His first job was as a wall painter apprentice, with his father. He was also a janitor at a bar and a Dentures laboratory; an office-boy at a bank agency, a clerk in a shirt store, and an elementary school teacher. From this latter experience he created his will to study languages. He graduated as a teacher and taught for more than forty years at the Communication School of the Federal University of Rio de Janeiro and at the Superior School of Design of the Rio de Janeiro State University.

His first job related to journalism was as an archivist at Tribuna da Imprensa, when he was still at university. However, he would only become a journalist when Carlos Lacerda (then manager-owner of the newspaper) asked to his employees if anyone would be able to write something about Albert Camus, who had recently died at the time. Zuenir offered himself and started his journalistic career.

Bibliography
 1968: O Ano que Não Terminou (1968: The Year That Didn't End) — Editora Nova Fronteira (1989, 2006)/Editora Planeta (2008)
 Cidade Partida (Broken City) — Companhia das Letras (1994)
 Inveja: Mal Secreto (Envy: Secret Evil) — Editora Objetiva (1998)
 Chico Mendes: Crime e Castigo: Quinze anos depois, o autor volta ao Acre para concluir a mais premiada reportagem sobre o herói dos povos da floresta (Chico Mendes: Crime and Punishment: Fifteen years later, the author returns to Acre to conclude the most awarded reportage about the hero of the people of the forest) — Companhia das Letras (2003)
 1968: O que Fizemos de Nós (1968: What We Did of Us) — Editora Planeta do Brasil (2009)

References

1931 births
Living people
Brazilian journalists
People from Minas Gerais
Brazilian columnists
Brazilian non-fiction writers
Academic staff of the Federal University of Rio de Janeiro
Academic staff of the Rio de Janeiro State University